The 2016 IIHF World Championship Division III was an international ice hockey tournament run by the International Ice Hockey Federation. It was contested in Istanbul, Turkey, from 31 March to 6 April 2016. The host team, Turkey, won all of its games and was promoted to Division II B for 2017.

The United Arab Emirates withdrew shortly before the tournament, leaving six teams to play. Bosnia and Herzegovina recorded their first victory in an IIHF tournament, defeating Hong Kong 5–4. Georgia's results were later recorded as 5–0 forfeits due to the use of ineligible players.

Venue

Participants

Match officials
4 referees and 7 linesmen were selected for the tournament.

Referees
 Stefan Hogarth
 Christoffer Holm
 Joonas Kova
 Valentin Lascar

Linesmen
 Yasin Akyürek
 Murat Aygün
 Knut Braten
 Timo Heinonen
 Charlie O'Connor
 Josef Špůr
 Laurynas Stepankevičius

Standings

Results
All times are local (UTC+3).
Due to eligibility violations all of Georgia's games were declared 5–0 forfeits.

Awards and statistics

Awards

Best players selected by the directorate:
 Best Goaltender:  Erol Kahraman
 Best Defenceman:  Andre Marais
 Best Forward:  Boris Kochkin
Source: IIHF.com

Scoring leaders

GP = Games played; G = Goals; A = Assists; Pts = Points; +/− = Plus/minus; PIM = Penalties in minutes; POS = Position
Source: IIHF.com

Goaltending leaders
Only the top five goaltenders, based on save percentage, who have played at least 40% of their team's minutes, are included in this list.

TOI = Time on Ice (minutes:seconds); SA = Shots against; GA = Goals against; GAA = Goals against average; Sv% = Save percentage; SO = Shutouts
Source: IIHF.com

References
 Official site

2016
Division III
2016 IIHF World Championship Division III 
2016 IIHF World Championship Division III
World